Alsager is a former Urban District in Cheshire, based in the town of Alsager. It was created in 1894 and abolished in 1974 when it was incorporated into the Borough of Congleton, which was itself abolished in 2009.

Details of the archives - now with Cheshire Archives and Local Studies here 

Districts of England created by the Local Government Act 1894
Districts of England abolished by the Local Government Act 1972
History of Cheshire
Urban districts of England
Former districts of Cheshire